Juan Bautista Topete y Carballo (24 May 1821 – 29 October 1885), was a Spanish admiral and politician.

He was born in San Andrés Tuxtla, Mexico. 

His father and grandfather were also Spanish admirals. He entered the navy at the age of seventeen, cut out a Carlist vessel in 1839, and became a midshipman at twenty-two, obtaining the cross of naval merit for saving the life of a sailor in 1841 and became a lieutenant in 1845. He served on the West Indian station for three years, and was engaged in repressing the slave trade before he was promoted frigate captain in 1857. He was promoted chief of staff to the fleet during the Moroccan War, 1859, after which he received the crosses of Saint Ferdinad and Saint Hermenegild.

Having been appointed chief of the Carrara arsenal at Cádiz, he was elected a deputy and joined the Union Liberal of O'Donnell and Serrano. He was sent out to the Pacific in command of the frigate "Blanca," and was present at the bombardment of Valparaíso and Callao, where he was badly wounded, and in other engagements of the war between Chile and Peru.

On his return to Spain, Topete was made port captain at Cádiz, which enabled him to take the lead of the conspiracy in the fleet against the Bourbon monarchy. He sent the steamer "Buenaventura" to the Canary Islands for Serrano and the other exiles; and when Prim and Sagasta arrived from Gibraltar, the whole fleet under the influence of Topete took such an attitude that the people, garrison and authorities of Cádiz followed suit.

Topete took part in all the posts of the revolutionary government, accepted the post of marine minister, was elected a member of the Cortes in 1869, and supported the pretensions of Antoine, Duke of Montpensier. He initially opposed the election of Amadeus, but latter sat on several cabinets seats of that king's reign. He was prosecuted by the federal republic of 1873 and again took charge of the marine under Serrano in 1874. After the Restoration, he was held aloof for many years, but finally accepted the presidency of a naval board in 1877. Later, he sat in the Senate as a life peer until his death in Madrid.

References

Attribution

|-

|-
 

1821 births
1885 deaths
People from Veracruz
People of the Chincha Islands War
Prime Ministers of Spain
Spanish admirals
Liberal Union (Spain) politicians
Laureate Cross of Saint Ferdinand
Grand Crosses of the Royal and Military Order of San Hermenegild
Overseas ministers of Spain
Government ministers during the First Spanish Republic